William de Lindsay (died 1247), Lord of Lamberton and Molesworth, Fordington and Ulceby, Sheriff of Berwick was a Scottish noble, who held lands in Scotland and England.

Life
Lindsay was a son of Walter de Lindsay of Lamberton. William was Sheriff of Berwick during his lifetime and was one of the barons who signed a letter alongside King Alexander II of Scotland in 1237 concerning the Treaty of York. He died in 1247.

Marriages and issue
William married Alice, daughter of Gilbert fitz Roger fitz Reinfried and Helwise de Lancaster, they are known to have had the following issue:
Walter II de Lindsay of Lamberton

He married secondly Marjory, Countess of Buchan, without issue.

Citations

References
Mosley, Charles, editor. Burke's Peerage, Baronetage & Knightage, 107th edition, Volume 1. Wilmington, Delaware, U.S.A.: Burke's Peerage (Genealogical Books) Ltd, 2003.

1247 deaths
13th-century Scottish people
Medieval Scottish knights
William I